The Thiruppunavayil Shiva temple  is located on the seashore in Thiruppunavasal near Pudukkotai in Tamil nadu. This temple is regarded as the 7th of the Tevara Stalams in the Pandya region of Tamil Nadu. The presiding deity is called Vruddhapureeswarar or Pazhampathinathar.

Mythology
Thiruppunavayil has it that the 4 Vedas, Bhrama, Lakshmi and Mahavishnu along with Indra, Surya, Chandra, Yama, Airavatam, Vasishta and Agasthyar worshipped Shiva here.

All of the 14 shrines in the Pandya Kingdom sung by the Nayanmars are said to manifest themselves here.  There are 14 Shivalingams in this temple.

Thiruppunavayil kovil is a parihara sthalam for Mangala dosha.

It is belief that only blessed will be called to visit this place. Kanchi Maha Periyava held this place in high regards. On his visit to the place, before entering the kshetram he removed his sandals in reverence.

Temple structure
The presiding deity lord shiva is called as Vruddhapureeswarar or Pazhampathi nathar,  and the Ambal his consort mother Parvathy is called as Karunai Nayaki or Periya Nayaki, who has a separate shrine.

There are two entrances to the temple corresponding to the Shiva and the Ambal shrines. Massive walls surrounding the temple and the picturesque Rajagopuram beautify this shrine. The temple architecture is a fusion of Pandyan and Cholan architectures in that the Vimana gopurum above the Sanctum is also as tall. The Nandi and the Shivalingam are huge here. The Shiva lingam in the sanctum sanatorium is installed on a big Avudayar (the base or the seat for placing the deity). The base of the Shiva lingam, aavudai is around 82.5 feet in circumference, with the Lingam itself being about 9 feet tall. Devotees present a specially made 90 feet cloth for the deity here to adorn the Lingam. Abisheakam is performed using a special ladder that goes across the aavudai. Periyanayaki has a separate shrine. There is a shrine for Kudavarai Kali opposite to this, who is believed to bless pregnancy and delivery [there are no delivery hospitals in the vicinity]. All of the 14 shrines in the Pandya Kingdom sung by the Nayanmars are said to manifest themselves here. There are 14 Shivalingams in this temple. The niches around the sanctum sanctorum are enshrined with Ganapati, Dakshinamurty and in place of Lingodbhavar, Mahavishnu is placed. Lord Hanuman is too found in this temple. The Nataraja Sabha here is referred to as the Sivagnana Sabha.

Poems on this temple
It is one of the shrines of the 275 Paadal Petra Sthalams. Sambandar, Appar and Sundarar composed the thevara Pathigam on the lord in this temple. It is one of the shrines of the Vaippu Sthalams.

Festivals
The annual Bhrammotsavam is conducted in the tamil month of Vaikasi.

Location
This temple can be reached by travelling from Arantangi to Meemisal (38 km) and from there to Tiruppunavayil (12 km).

References

External links
 http://www.templenet.com/Tamilnadu/s210.html
 http://www.shivatemples.com/pnaadu/pn07.html
 http://temple.dinamalar.com/en/new_en.php?id=254
 http://www.thevaaram.org/thirumurai_1/koil_view.php?koil_idField=222
 Muvar Thevara Vaippu Thalangal, மூவர் தேவார வைப்புத்தலங்கள்,  aNNalvAyil, Sl.No.3 of 139 temples
 Shiva Temples, தேவார வைப்புத்தலங்கள், அண்ணல்வாயில், Sl.No.5 of 133 temples, page1

See also
 Virutthapurisvarar Temple, Annavasal

Hindu temples in Pudukkottai district
Padal Petra Stalam